William David Douglas Harwood (15 September 1920 – 6 September 1980) was an Australian rules footballer who played with Geelong and South Melbourne in the Victorian Football League (VFL).

Notes

External links 

1920 births
1980 deaths
Australian rules footballers from Victoria (Australia)
Geelong Football Club players
Sydney Swans players